Ittlingen is a town in the district of Heilbronn in Baden-Württemberg, Germany.

History
Their rule ended in 1806, when the Gemmingens' properties were mediatized to the Grand Duchy of Baden. On 24 July 1813, Ittlingen was assigned to the district of Eppingen. Ittlingen expanded after World War II to its west. On 31 December 1972, Sinsheim's district was dissolved and Ittlingen was placed under the jurisdiction of Heilbronn.

Geography
Ittlingen lies along the northwest edge of Heilbronn's district, on its border with the Rhine-Neckar district to the north. The municipal area is physically located in the Kraichgau, specifically in the valley of the river Elsenz, which flows through the municipality from south to north. Elevation above sea level in the municipal area ranges from a high of  Normalnull (NN) on the Lochberg, to the west, to a low of  NN at the municipal border with Sinsheim.

Coat of arms
Ittlingen's municipal coat of arms displays a field of blue crossed by two yellow bars. At the center of the blazon is another, with a yellow plowshare upon a field of red. This pattern was accepted and a municipal flag issued by the Heilbronn district office on 1 October 1980.

References

External links

 

Heilbronn (district)